Gündeş is a village in the Çukurca District in Hakkâri Province in Turkey. The village is populated by Kurds of the Kaşuran tribe and had a population of 2,324 in 2022.

The six hamlets of Boylu, Köprülü, Güzeldere, Ormanlı, Çiçekli and Çimenli are attached to Cevizli. Boylu and Çiçekli are unpopulated.

Ormanlı 
Ormanlı is a hamlet which historically was an Assyrian village and  part of the lower Tyari district. Between 1850 and 1877, the village had ninety members of Syriac Christianity including one priest. There was moreover a church in the village during this period. The village was destroyed during Sayfo. The hamlet is populated by Kurds of Alan and Êzdînan tribes today and had a population of 438 in 2022.

Population 
Population history of the village from 2007 to 2022:

References 

Kurdish settlements in Hakkâri Province
Villages in Çukurca District